Nayef Saoud Faris Al Kadi (born 1944) is a retired Jordanian Ambassador he was Deputy Prime Minister and Minister of Interior.

Career
In 1965 he joined the Jordanian Diplomatic Service.
From 1969 to 1973 he was deputy chief of the mission in Baghdad (Iraq).
From 1970 to 1974 he was Chargé d'affaires in Baghdad (Iraq).
From 1973 to 1980 he was Consul in London.
From 1980 to 1983 he was Deputy Vice-Representative to the Arab League.
From 1983 to 1984 he was Chargé d'affaires in Beirut.
From 1984 to 1989 he was Counselor at the Jordanian Embassy in London.
From 1989 to 1993 he was Ambassador in Doha (Qatar).
From 1993 to 1994 he was Ambassador in Cairo (Egypt) and Permanent Representative to the Arab League. 
He was part of the delegation that negotiated the Jordanian-Israeli peace treaty.
From 1997 to 2003 he was appointed Senator to the upper house of parliament.
From 1998 to 2000 he was Deputy Prime Minister and Minister of Interior.
In 1999 he oversaw the closure of HAMAS's Jordan office and the deportation of several Hamas members.
In 2009 he was a Deputy Prime Minister and again Jordanian Minister of Interior.

References

1944 births
Living people
Ambassadors of Jordan to Qatar
Ambassadors of Jordan to Egypt
Interior ministers of Jordan
Members of the Senate of Jordan